Stanisław Kohn  (1895–1940) was a Polish chess master.

Kohn played for Poland in 1st unofficial Chess Olympiad at Paris 1924.

In 1925, he won the Warsaw Championship. In 1926, he tied for 3rd-7th, behind Dawid Przepiórka and Paulin Frydman in the 1st Polish Chess Championship in Warsaw. In 1927, he tied for 5-7th in Łódź (2nd POL-ch, Akiba Rubinstein won), and shared 1st with Leon Kremer in the Warsaw Championship.

See also
 List of Jewish chess players

References

External links

1895 births
1940 deaths
Polish Jews who died in the Holocaust
Polish chess players
Jewish chess players
Place of birth missing
20th-century chess players
Polish civilians killed in World War II
People executed by Nazi Germany by firing squad
Deaths by firearm in Poland